is a train station located in Sakyō-ku ward, city of Kyoto, Kyoto Prefecture, Japan.

Lines
 Eizan Electric Railway (Eiden)
 Eizan Main Line

Adjacent stations

References

Railway stations in Kyoto Prefecture
Railway stations in Japan opened in 1925